Kotliarka or Kotlyarka is a village in Ukraine, located in the Zhytomyr Raion of the Zhytomyr Oblast (province).

The name of the village might be derived from the Ukrainian word kotliar, which means 'boilermaker'.

In 2014, according to the Popilnia Raion Council, the village population was 429 people (204 men and 225 women) of 261 households.

There are a kindergarten, school, community club, library, medical assistant's, post office, 2 retail shops, cafe, place of worship in the village.

Geography 
The village is situated in the North-West of the Dnieper Upland and the historical region Right-bank Ukraine.

There is a pond on the river in the village, that is called the Kryvenka Reservoir.

Two not too big forests are in the south of the village towards  and  villages. They were parts of a large forest in the Popilnia Raion, that forest was significantly cut down because of the intensive potash production in 14th - 19th centuries there, which needed a lot of wood.

By roads, the village is located:
 14 km to the nearest railway station .
 15 km to the district centre Popilnia.
 58 km to the region centre Zhytomyr.
 138 km to the capital of Ukraine Kyiv.
 153 km to Boryspil International Airport.

History

Early time 
Next to the village, Serpent's Walls and ancient kurgans were found. The Ukrainian historian Volodymyr Antonovych mentioned the village in his work "The archaeological map of the Kiev Governorate" 1895. He marked 2 large and 12 small kurgans in 3 kilometres from the village.

Before the Kievan Rus epoch it was a territory of Eastern Polans and approximately 8 kilometres to the north, on the left bank of the Irpin River  Drevlians' land began.

At the time of the Kievan Rus and  the Grand Duchy of Lithuania this land belonged to the Principality of Kiev. There were no allusions about any permanent human settlements in there, which can be associated with the modern village Kotliarka, at that time.

Kingdom of Poland period 

In 1648 - 1714 the land of present Kotliarka village belonged to the  Sotnia of the Pavoloch Regiment of the Cossack Hetmanate.

The village is mentioned in a history of 1753 year, there was an alleged ritual murder of nobleman's child by Jews in the nearby village . The investigation was led directly by the Bishop of Kiev of the Roman Catholic Church Kajetan Sołtyk. One of the accused of the crime was the arendator Moysha from Kotliarka, who was dismembered in Zhytomyr in the end. This story was included into the book "About the meaning and significance of blood sacrifice" by the theologist , who was one of the founders of the Black Hundreds movement - "Russian Assembly".

Russian Empire period 

After the Second Partition of Poland in 1793 the village went to the Russian Empire and since 1796 the village belonged to the Kiev Governorate.

The ethnographer  in his work "" mentioned the village. The owners of the village were descendants of August Slyvynsky. There were 520 Orthodox Christians and 100 Catholics in the village.

In the middle of the 19th century, according to the registry books of the Holy Dormition church, there were the following names: Makarchuk, Vlasiuk, Sydorchuk, Motsak, Starunsky, Pastushenko, Stetsenko, Ovdiushka, Artemchuk, Kubdiak, Ivaniuk, Kolysnychenko, Yakovchuk, Okseniuk and Pavlenchuk distributing among villagers.

The chynshovyks seized back the land that had previously rented them from the landlord Slyvynsky for quit-rents. After police arrested the riot organiser Baladinski, he was released by about forty his fellows, who were armed with clubs. The police managed to stop the riot, there were 26 rebels arrested, they subsequently got various terms of imprisonment. However, the landlord was advised to refrain from attempts to change the tenants of the land.

Soviet era 

At the time of the Ukrainian People's Republic from 1918 to 1919 Kotliarka was a part of the  according to the administrative division of Ukraine (1918).

In 1920 the general staff of bolsheviks' 1st Cavalry Army was situated in the village.

As a result of the Ukrainian–Soviet War (1917–1921) and the Polish–Soviet War (1919–1921) Right-bank Ukraine, including the village, was finally captured by the Red Army.

After the Treaty on the Creation of the USSR in 1922, the village came into the Popilnia Raion of the Zhytomyr Okruha of the Ukrainian Soviet Socialist Republic.

There were names of 101 victims of the Holodomor 1932-1933 ascertained on the basis of the stories of the eyewitnesses S. Babych, P. Vilchynska, Y. Zavadska, S. Monastyretsky and S. Sokyrko.

Since the formation of the Zhytomyr Oblast in 1937, the village has belonged to it.

During the Political repression in the Soviet Union, especially in the Great Purge, a lot of villagers were being executed or deported. Ethnic Ukrainian families: Babych, Blinkevych, Ivaniuk, Kyianchuk, Mozharivsky, Savchuk, Syvkovych, Tkach, Vazytsky, Vitkivsky and Polish families: Baladinski, Czopiwski, Dimovicz, Drenczik, Kaszperski, Mozarowski, Rowinski, Rudnicki, Smogorzewski, Werpachowski, Wilczinski, Zawadski were subjected to repression.

Many villagers were conscripted into the Red Army and killed during the Winter War (Soviet-Finnish War 1939–1940).

150 villagers fought in the Red Army in World War II, 82 of them died and 63 were awarded orders and medals. In 1954, the monument to fallen soldiers was erected.

Businesses 
 A brick factory of "Sunway Trade LTD".
Farms:

Prominent people

References 

Villages in Zhytomyr Raion